John Robert Flack (born 30 May 1942) is an English Anglican bishop. He is a former Bishop of Huntingdon and Director of the Anglican Centre in Rome.

Flack was educated at Leeds University and the College of the Resurrection at Mirfield. He was made deacon in 1966 and ordained priest in 1967. After curacies at Armley and Northampton he was Vicar of St James Chapelthorpe from 1972 to 1981. From here he rose steadily in the church's hierarchy, being successively Team Rector of Brighouse, Rural Dean of Elland and Archdeacon of Pontefract before his ordination to the episcopate. He was consecrated a bishop on 8 January 1997 at Southwark Cathedral, and served as Bishop of Huntington (suffragan bishop in the Diocese of Ely) until 2003. He was subsequently Director of the Anglican Centre in Rome until 2008. On his return to the UK, he was Priest-in-charge of Apethorpe, Nassington, Thornhaugh, Wansford, Woodnewton and Yarwell, in Northamptonshire and Cambridgeshire, until retiring in 2012. During this time, he also served as an Honorary Assistant Bishop in the Dioceses of Peterborough and of Ely, from which he retired in 2017.

References

Alumni of the College of the Resurrection
1942 births
Alumni of the University of Leeds
Bishops of Huntingdon
Archdeacons of Pontefract
20th-century Church of England bishops
21st-century Church of England bishops
Living people